Alice Bertha Kroeger (May 2, 1864 – October 31, 1909) was an American librarian and educator. Kroeger was a student of Melvil Dewey. She founded the library science program at Drexel University in 1892 and directed  the program until her death in 1909.

Kroeger was born in St. Louis, Missouri to Adolph Ernst Kroeger, a journalist, philosopher, and translator, and Eliza Bertha Curren. After graduating from St. Louis public schools in 1881 she took a job as a clerk in the St. Louis Public Library. She worked for the St. Louis Public Library from 1882 to 1889 under Frederick M. Crunden. At the 1889 meeting of the American Library Association in St. Louis, Kroeger was recognized by noted librarian Charles Ammi Cutter.  She enrolled in the New York State Library School at Albany, where she studied under Melvil Dewey.

In 1891 Kroeger became librarian of the Drexel Institute of Art, Science and Industry when it opened in Philadelphia. In November 1892 she launched the library school at Drexel. Drexel was the fourth library school to open in the United States. She lectured at the University of Pennsylvania.

Publications
Study and Use of Reference Books (1908)

References

External links
 WorldCat

1864 births
1909 deaths
American librarians
American women librarians